Sathyaseelan (Tamil: சத்தியசீலன்) is a 1936 Tamil-language film directed by B. Sampathkumar and Produced by M.K. Thyagaraja Bhagavathar. starring M. K. Thyagaraja Bhagavathar, M.S. Devasena, S.D. Subbulakshmi, S.S. Mani Bhagavathar. It was the first film of Thyagaraja Bhagavathar's own production.

Cast 

Cast according to the song book

Male cast
 M. K. Thyagaraja Bhagavathar as Sathya Seelan
 M. Ramaswamy Iyer as King Vikrama Singam
 T. S. Somasundaram as Nithyanandar
 M. P. Mohan as Prathapuradhran
 L. Narayana Rao as Dharmadhan
 L. Rajamanickam as Vimalanathan
 P. S. Kasilingam as Chandamaruthan
 M. Muthuramalingam as Kunju
 K. R. Mani Iyer as Veerabhadran

Female cast
 M. S. Devasena as Premavathi
 G. Padmavathi Bai as Queen Vedavalli
 T. V. Kanthimathi Bai as Kuyili

Production 
Bhagavathar was producer of this film. The total cost of the film is Rs 52,000.

Soundtrack

References

Bibliography 

1936 films
1930s Tamil-language films
Indian black-and-white films
Films scored by Janakai Kavikunjaram